Boğatepe (former Zavot or Büyük Zavot) is a village in Turkey.

The population of the village was   218   as of 2014.
During the Russo-Turkish War (1877–1878), the village was annexed by the Russian Empire. Russians settled Molokans in the village which was then named Zavot ("Dairy" in Russian Language). After the  First World War the village was returned to Turkey. While some of the Molokans migrated to Soviet Union,  Karapapak Turks from Georgia settled in the village. Molokans were cheese producers and the newcomers also began producing cheese. Now the village is known as a cheese producing village.

See also
Boğatepe Cheese Museum

References

Villages in Kars Province
Kars Central District